Chinedu Silver Ezeikpe is a paralympic athlete from Nigeria (born 2 April 1971) competing mainly in category F58 throws events.

Silver competed in the shot and javelin in the 2004 Summer Paralympics winning the gold medal in the F58 javelin and setting a world record.  He then competed in the 2008 Summer Paralympics in all three throws but was unable to follow his first games performance, and left with no medals.

References

Paralympic athletes of Nigeria
Athletes (track and field) at the 2004 Summer Paralympics
Athletes (track and field) at the 2008 Summer Paralympics
Paralympic gold medalists for Nigeria
Living people
Medalists at the 2004 Summer Paralympics
African Games bronze medalists for Nigeria
African Games medalists in athletics (track and field)
Athletes (track and field) at the 2011 All-Africa Games
Paralympic medalists in athletics (track and field)
Nigerian javelin throwers
21st-century Nigerian people
1971 births